Disability fraud is the receipt of payment(s) intended for disabled people from a government agency or private insurance company by one who should not be receiving them, or the receipt of a higher amount than one is entitled to. There are various acts that may constitute disability fraud. These include feigning a medical problem in order to be declared disabled, exaggeration of an existing medical problem that potentially can but in reality does not render the person disabled, continuing to receive payments after having recovered from a medical problem, or continuing to receive payments while working (usually unreported) above the allowable level for those receiving the payments.

Disability fraud can be harder to detect than other forms of fraud, as the majority of people receiving disability payments (at least 90%) do not use a wheelchair or walker, or uses a wheelchair but is able to walk limited distances sometimes, while at the same time, many people who need wheelchairs would not qualify for disability payments. Since most disabilities are "silent" (meaning that they cannot be seen by others), it is not easy to visually determine if a person receiving disability is not disabled. Such people are often able to perform physical activities, but have some other underlying cause of their disability. It is therefore common for people to believe they must report a neighbor whom they see, for example, climbing on the roof while collecting disability payments, but this is not always the case.

Meanwhile, true disability fraud cases exist, for which it is hard to determine the cause as being fraudulent. Often, the perpetrator claims to have a medical condition to be declared disabled. Some medical conditions are truly debilitating and make it impossible or difficult to work if one has them, but are hard to prove against one's own word that one does not have them. Even if one with one of them is viewed engaging in some other "work-like" activity not for pay, they may have difficulty holding a job.

It is possible that the illegal recipient of the disability payments is not truly disabled, and may have a case of work aversion, which in many countries is not alone considered a valid reason for being declared disabled, or the person may otherwise lack a work ethic. Others who are receiving payments are actually working, but are not reporting their employment and collecting their income in a manner that cannot easily be detected.

Disability fraud can result in denial of future benefits as well as criminal prosecution.

Types of fraud
The United States Social Security Administration accepts reports from the public for the following types of fraud:
Applicants who state they are not married when they are. Those receiving Supplemental Security Income (SSI) can have their benefits reduced by their spouse's income and assets, so some applicants may wish to hide the existence, income, or assets of their spouse.
Claims of blindness. In particular, the Social Security Administration is concerned about those who declare they are blind and unable to drive, but are later found to be in possession of a driver's license and are observed (legally) operating a motor vehicle.
Unreported income. Some types of income that often go unreported are from renting out a portion of one's home, or from an insurance policy.
Employment changes, in a person who was not working at the time they applied for and started to receive benefits, but has since returned to work.
A person who is living in an institution, such as a long-term care facility or a prison.
A person who is the legal custodian (representative payee) of a disabled person's money spending it on some expense other than that of the disabled person.
A person who cashes the checks of a deceased person.

Notable cases
In 2006, a Massachusetts man was convicted of receiving more than $55,000 in disability payments while continuing to work at his bar. Antonios Sarantos, then 43, of Plymouth, Massachusetts, purchased and opened the T.J. Gupeez bar in Taunton, then purportedly injured his back working at the prison, several weeks later. Undercover officers reported witnessing Sarantos working in the bar, even as he contended he was too injured to return to prison work.

In 2007, a UK woman was convicted of more than £11,000 in disability fraud after she claimed she could walk only four meters in five minutes, but continued to work at a job she previously held sweeping horse stables.

In 2009, an Idaho man pleaded guilty to $1.5 million in disability fraud, the largest such case in the history of the Veterans Affairs Department.
In October 2011, a woman and three accomplices were arrested for, among other serious criminal allegations, collecting SSI benefits from four, and possibly more, mentally disabled adults, as their representative payee, and not using the money towards their well-being. The Philadelphia basement kidnapping event is under investigation by the FBI and Philadelphia law enforcement.
In 2013, NPR and This American Life reported on high rates of disability claims in poor rural counties, such as Hale County, Alabama, with 25% of residents claiming they are disabled and unable to work, often due to nebulous causes such as "back pain." As an alternate explanation to fraud, the article noted that these communities tend to only have jobs that require strenuous lifting.
In 2014, 106 people, including retired NYPD officers and FDNY firefighters, received a large disability pension of $400 million due to the aftereffect of the September 11 attacks, but the person involved was indicted after it was found to be false. At that time, the scam was known as the largest pension scam in the United States.

See also
Anosognosia for when the opposite happens and a person with a disability denies or is unaware that they have one.
Criticisms of welfare
Benefit fraud
Welfare fraud

References

Welfare fraud
Disability in law